Colin Mills (born Chester, Cheshire 6 January 1951) is a British educationalist and writer on children's literature, literacy and policy research. Educated at Chester College, (Cert. Ed., 1973) University of Liverpool, (B.Ed Hons, 1974, winning the Morrell Memorial Prize) and the University of London Institute of Education, (MA Ed, 1977, with distinction).  He has written on children's literacy and literature, including Language and Literacy  in the Primary School, (1988) with Margaret Meek, Connecting, Creating: new ideas in Teaching Writing (with Sue Ellis) 2005, and contributions to The Routledge Encyclopedia of Children's Literature (2003), and the International Companion Encyclopedia of Children's Literature' (2007). Later work focused on education policy and research, including the edited collection, with Professors Helen Gunter and David Hall, on Education Policy Research (Bloomsbury, 2014) and  Consultants and Consultancy: the case of Education (with Helen Gunter). Springer Publishers, 2017. Forthcoming works include a book on the marketisation of literacy in English primary schooling and an intellectual biography of Margaret Meek Spencer who was his supervisor, mentor and co-author in the 80s and 90s

He taught in schools in Cheshire and London, and worked as an advisory teacher and a researcher (1972-1989); and at Universities of Exeter, Central England, Worcester, (1989-2007); and, from September 2007, University of Manchester, where he was a Senior Teaching Fellow. Semi-retiring in 2014, he is now an Honorary Teaching Fellow. He is also an Honorary Research Fellow at Newman University, Birmingham and a visiting scholar at Ontario Institute for Studies in Education (OISE, Toronto).   His brother is the comedian and writer, Bob Mills.  His late father was the actor John Channell Mills.

References

British literary critics
1951 births
Living people